Laxmi Narayan Mandir or Lakshmi Narayan Temple may refer to the following Hindu temples dedicated to Lakshmi Narayan:

Asia
Lakshmi Narayan Temple, Agartala
Durgiana Temple, in Amritsar, India
Laxminarayan Temple, in Delhi
Laxmi Narayan Temple, Jaipur
Laxmi Narayan Temple, Orissa
Laxminarayan temple, Therubali, Orissa
Lakshmi Narayan temple, Chamba
Laxmi Narayan Mandir, Dhaka
Shri Laxmi Narayan Mandir, in Karachi, Pakistan
Laxmi Narain Mandir, in Mardan, Pakistan

Europe
Bradford Lakshmi Narayan Hindu Temple, in Bradford, England
Laxmi-Narayan Mandir, in Belfast

See also
Laxminarayan (disambiguation)